Caldwell is the given name of:

 Caldwell Hart Colt (1858–1894), American inventor and yachtsman and son of Samuel Colt
 Caldwell Edwards (1841-1922), U.S. Representative from Montana
 Caldwell Esselstyn (born 1933), American cardiologist and former Olympic rowing champion
 Caldwell Jones (born 1950), American retired basketball player
 Caldwell Stewart (1907-1967), Canadian politician and lawyer

Middle names
 M. Caldwell Butler (1925-2014), former U.S. Representative from Virginia
 Velma Caldwell Melville (1852-1924), American writer and poet